Fouzia Khan or Fauzia Tahseen Khan, also known as Fauzia Khan, is an Indian politician of the Nationalist Congress Party. She is a member of the Rajya Sabha the upper house of Indian Parliament from Maharashtra. She is the National president of Nationalist Mahila Congress (NCP's Women's wing), an Ex-Minister of State of Government of Maharashtra in India. She was two time M.L.C. i.e. member of  Legislative Council the upper house of Maharashtra Legislature. Convent-educated Khan is the first Muslim woman in the state who has served as minister in the Maharashtra government.

Portfolio held
She was minister of state (junior minister) with portfolios for School Education, Women & Child Development, Cultural Affairs, General Administration, Information & Public Relations, Minorities Development (including Aukaf), and Protocol.

Political profile
Fauzia Khan belongs  Nationalist Congress Party (NCP) of Sharad Pawar. She has been two times served as member of legislative council of Maharashtra. Her paternal home is Aurangabad, Maharashtra. She moved to Parbhani after marriage where she started her political career by contesting the election for the post of President of Parbhani Municipal Council.

Contributions
Fauzia Khan heads the Federation of All Maharashtra Minority Education Organisation (FAME) and runs several educational institutions in Parbhani.
In the year 2008 she donated 5 acres of land to develop off-campus educational complex by Maulana Azad National Urdu University (MANUU) at Aurangabad.
As a minister in Govt. of Maharashtra she was instrumental in identifying a 332-acre site for Aligarh Muslim University (AMU) Maharashtra Center at Khuldabad near Aurangabad.

References

People from Aurangabad, Maharashtra
Members of the Maharashtra Legislative Council
Living people
People from Parbhani
1957 births
Women in Maharashtra politics
People from Marathwada
Nationalist Congress Party politicians from Maharashtra
21st-century Indian women politicians
21st-century Indian politicians
People from Parbhani district
Muslim politics in India
21st-century Indian Muslims
Members of Parliament from Maharashtra
Rajya Sabha members from Maharashtra
Women members of the Rajya Sabha